Ernst Arnold Kohlschütter (6 July 1883 – 28 May 1969) was a German astronomer and astrophysicist from Halle.

In 1908 he was awarded his Ph.D. from the University of Göttingen under Karl Schwarzschild.

In 1911 he began working at the Mount Wilson observatory, studying the spectra of the Sun and stars in collaboration with Walter Sidney Adams. In 1914 they discovered that the absolute luminosity of a star is proportional to the relative intensity of the lines in the spectrum. This allowed astronomers to determine the distance of stars, including main sequence and giants, using the spectroscope.

He became the director of the Bonn observatory in 1925. Therein he was dedicated to astrometric studies, such as the Bonn portion of AGK2.

The crater Kohlschütter on the Moon is named after him.

See also
Ackermann–Teubner Memorial Award
Spectroscopic parallax

References

External links
 Arnold Kohlschütter 6. 7. 1883-28. 5. 1969, Astronomische Nachrichten, vol. 292, p. 142.
 Geschichte der Sternwarte der Universität Bonn

1883 births
1969 deaths
20th-century German astronomers
People from Halle (Saale)
People from the Province of Saxony
University of Göttingen alumni
Academic staff of the University of Göttingen
Academic staff of the University of Kiel
Academic staff of the University of Hamburg